Schiff Scout Reservation refers to one of two Boy Scout reservations (campgrounds) located in the United States:

Mortimer L. Schiff Scout Reservation, located in Mendham, New Jersey
John M. Schiff Scout Reservation, located in Wading River, New York